Jeffrey Martin Ettinger (born October 18, 1958) is an American corporate executive, businessman, philanthropist, politician, and attorney who served as CEO of Hormel Foods. As Hormel's CEO from 2005 until 2016, he led the company through a period of major growth in market value. Ettinger now runs the corporate Hormel Foundation, which gives millions of dollars to charitable causes in Austin, Minnesota, and serves on the boards of several other companies.

Early life and education
Ettinger was born in Pasadena, California. He earned a Bachelor of Arts degree and Juris Doctor from the University of California, Los Angeles.

Career
Ettinger served as a law clerk to Judge Arthur Alarcón of the United States Court of Appeals for the Ninth Circuit. He has worked at Hormel since 1989, fulfilling roles such as senior corporate attorney (1989–1993), treasurer (1998–1999), and president of Jennie-O (1999–2003). He later worked as vice president and general counsel of Comar Marketing. He was a member of the American Meat Institute board of directors, the Grocery Manufacturers Association board of directors, and the Minnesota Business Partnership board of directors. He became Hormel's president, CEO, and chairman of the board in 2005 and retired as CEO on October 30, 2016. He continued to serve as chairman of the board until retiring on November 20, 2017.

Ettinger was the Democratic nominee for the 2022 Minnesota's 1st congressional district special election and for the regular election in November 2022. Ettinger lost both elections to Brad Finstad.

Personal life 
Ettinger and his wife, LeeAnn, have four children. They live in Austin, Minnesota.

Ettinger is Catholic.

References

External links
 Jeff Ettinger for Congress campaign website

1958 births
American chief executives of food industry companies
Businesspeople from Minnesota
Catholics from Minnesota
Hormel Foods people
Living people
Minnesota Democrats
Minnesota lawyers
People from Austin, Minnesota
People from Pasadena, California
Philanthropists from Minnesota
UCLA Anderson School of Management alumni
UCLA School of Law alumni
Candidates in the 2022 United States House of Representatives elections
20th-century American businesspeople
20th-century American lawyers
21st-century American businesspeople